Eocarterus chodshenticus is a species of ground beetle in the genus Eocarterus.

References

C
Beetles described in 1871